Tague can refer to: surnames.

Places

 Tague, West Virginia

People

 James Tague (1936-2014), a notable witness to the assassination of US President John F. Kennedy
 Peter Francis Tague (1871–1941), member of the US House of Representatives from Massachusetts
 Robert Bruce Tague (1912-1985), an American modernist architect and abstract artist from Chicago, Illinois